The Riot Act Tour was a concert tour by the American rock band Pearl Jam to support its seventh album, Riot Act.

History
Pearl Jam promoted Riot Act with tours in Australia, Japan, and North America in 2003. The tours were the band's first with keyboardist Boom Gaspar. The two legs of the North American tour focused on the Midwestern United States, the East Coast, and the West Coast. Opening acts for the tours included Johnny Marr, Sparta, Sleater-Kinney, Buzzcocks and Idlewild.

Pearl Jam received much publicity for its energetic politically charged performances during the tour. The band gave a noteworthy performance during the encore of its February 23, 2003 show in Perth at the Burswood Dome where it was joined on stage by Hunters & Collectors frontman Mark Seymour to perform "Throw Your Arms Around Me", a personal favorite of vocalist Eddie Vedder. At many shows during the 2003 North American tour, Vedder performed Riot Act'''s "Bu$hleaguer", a commentary on President George W. Bush, with a rubber mask of Bush, wearing it at the beginning of the song and then hanging it on a mic stand to allow him to sing. The band made news when it was reported that several fans left after Vedder had "impaled" the Bush mask on his mic stand at the band's April 1, 2003 show in Denver, Colorado at the Pepsi Center. Following a performance of the song at Pearl Jam's April 30, 2003 show in Uniondale, New York at the Nassau Coliseum, the band was met with boos from the crowd and chants of "U-S-A." Vedder responded by defending his right to free speech and the band followed with a performance of The Clash's "Know Your Rights".

The song "Arc" was performed by Vedder at nine shows during the second North American leg of the tour as a tribute to the victims of the Roskilde disaster. On the second leg of the North American tour the band performed a three-day set of Boston shows at the Tweeter Center Boston. Pearl Jam played a completely different set list each night, spanning 105 songs from its catalog with only one repeat between the three shows, the popular concert-ending "Yellow Ledbetter". In May 2003, Pearl Jam extended its North American tour by announcing that it would be playing in Mexico for the first time. Before the first concert on July 17, 2003 in Mexico City at Palacio de los Deportes, the band gave its first press conference in almost ten years. In addition, the third concert was transmitted live on radio and television to all of Latin America for free.

The Australia, Japan, and North America tours were documented by a long series of official bootlegs, all of which were available through the band's official website. A total of six bootlegs were made available in record stores: Perth, Tokyo, State College, Pennsylvania, two shows from Madison Square Garden, and Mansfield, Massachusetts. One of the four warm-up dates was released as a DVD entitled Live at the Showbox, which was made available through the band's website. The first of two shows at Madison Square Garden was released as the Live at the Garden'' DVD.

Tour dates
Information taken from various sources.

Band members
Pearl Jam
Jeff Ament – bass guitar
Stone Gossard – rhythm guitar
Mike McCready – lead guitar
Eddie Vedder – lead vocals, guitar
Matt Cameron – drums

Additional musicians
Boom Gaspar – Hammond B3 and keyboards

Live albums
February 23, 2003 Perth Australia- released June 10, 2003

Songs performed

Originals

"1/2 Full"
"Alive"
"All or None"
"All Those Yesterdays"
"Animal"
"Arc"
"Better Man"
"Black"
"Blood"
"Brain of J."
"Breakerfall"
"Breath"
"Bu$hleaguer"
"Can't Keep"
"Corduroy"
"Cropduster"
"Daughter"
"Dead Man"
"Deep"
"Dissident"
"Do the Evolution"
"Down"
"Drifting"
"Elderly Woman Behind the Counter in a Small Town"
"Evacuation"
"Even Flow"
"Faithfull"
"Footsteps"
"Free Jazz"
"Get Right"
"Ghost"
"Given to Fly"
"Glorified G"
"Go"
"Gods' Dice"
"Green Disease"
"Grievance"
"Habit"
"Hail, Hail"
"Help Help"
"I Am Mine"
"I Got Id"
"Immortality"
"In Hiding"
"In My Tree"
"Indifference"
"Insignificance"
"Jeremy"
"Last Exit"
"Leatherman"
"Light Years"
"Long Road"
"Love Boat Captain"
"Low Light"
"Lukin"
"Mankind"
"MFC"
"Not for You"
"Nothing as It Seems"
"Nothingman"
"Oceans"
"Of the Girl"
"Off He Goes"
"Once"
"Parting Ways"
"Porch"
"Present Tense"
"Rearviewmirror"
"Red Mosquito"
"Release"
"Rival"
"Satan's Bed"
"Save You"
"Sleight of Hand"
"Smile"
"Sometimes"
"Soon Forget"
"Spin the Black Circle"
"State of Love and Trust"
"Thin Air"
"Thumbing My Way"
"Tremor Christ"
"U"
"Untitled"
"W.M.A." (snippet)
"Wash"
"Whipping"
"Why Go"
"Wishlist"
"Yellow Ledbetter"
"You Are"

Covers
"Androgynous Mind" (Sonic Youth) (snippet)
"Another Brick in the Wall" (Pink Floyd) (snippet)
"Atomic Dog" (George Clinton) (snippet)
"Baba O'Riley" (The Who)
"Blitzkrieg Bop" (Ramones) (snippet)
"Blue, Red and Grey" (The Who)
"Crazy Mary" (Victoria Williams)
"Crown of Thorns" (Mother Love Bone)
"Dig Me Out" (Sleater-Kinney) (snippet)
"Don't Be Shy" (Cat Stevens)
"Don't Believe In Christmas" (The Sonics)
"Driven to Tears" (The Police)
"Everyday" (Buddy Holly)
"Fortunate Son" (Creedence Clearwater Revival)
"Fuckin' Up" (Neil Young)
"Gimme Some Truth" (John Lennon)
"Give Peace a Chance" (Plastic Ono Band) (snippet)
"Growin' Up" (Bruce Springsteen)
"Guantanamera" (Joseíto Fernández)
"Happy Birthday" (traditional)
"Highway to Hell" (AC/DC) (snippet)
"History Never Repeats" (Split Enz)
"Hunger Strike" (Temple of the Dog)
"I Am a Patriot" (Steven Van Zandt)
"I Believe in Miracles" (Ramones)
"I See Red" (Split Enz)
"I Won't Back Down" (Tom Petty)
"I've Been Tired" (Pixies) (snippet)
"Interstellar Overdrive" (Pink Floyd) (snippet)
"Jools and Jim" (Pete Townshend) (snippet)
"The Kids Are Alright" (The Who)
"Know Your Rights" (The Clash)
"La Bamba" (Ritchie Valens)
"Last Kiss" (Wayne Cochran)
"Leaving Here" (Edward Holland, Jr.)
"Luck Be a Lady" (Frank Sinatra) (snippet)
"No More Pain" (Embrace) (snippet)
"Nobody's Fault But Mine" (Led Zeppelin) (snippet)
"People Have the Power" (Patti Smith)
"Rains on Me" (Tom Waits) (snippet)
"Rockin' in the Free World" (Neil Young)
"Save It for Later" (The Beat)
"Should I Stay or Should I Go" (The Clash) (snippet)
"Soldier of Love (Lay Down Your Arms)" (Arthur Alexander)
"Song X" (Neil Young) (snippet)
"Sonic Reducer" (The Dead Boys)
"Start Me Up" (The Rolling Stones) (snippet)
"Throw Your Arms Around Me" (Hunters & Collectors)
"War" (Edwin Starr) (snippet)
"Why Can't I Touch It?" (Buzzcocks) (snippet)
"Wild Thing" (The Troggs) (snippet)
"With My Own Two Hands" (Ben Harper) (snippet)
"You've Got to Hide Your Love Away" (The Beatles)

Gallery

References

2003 concert tours
Pearl Jam concert tours